Elektro-Slovenija, d.o.o. (ELES) is a state-owned electricity transmission company of Slovenia. The company was founded in 1991 by the Government of Slovenia. It is the only power transmission system operator in the country.

ELES is a member of the European Network of Transmission System Operators for Electricity (ENTSO-E).

See also

Holding Slovenske elektrarne

References

External links

 

Electric power transmission system operators in Slovenia
Energy companies established in 1991
1991 establishments in Slovenia
Government-owned energy companies